Belén is a small town in the province of Catamarca, Argentina. Belén is  the birthplace of Luis Franco.

References

 
 Departamento Belén - Provincia de Catamarca — Official website.

Populated places in Catamarca Province
Cities in Argentina
Argentina